Tower is a city located in Saint Louis County, Minnesota, United States.  As of the 2020 census, the city had a total population of 430. State Highways 1 (MN 1), 169 (MN 169), and 135 (MN 135) are three of the main routes in Tower. Tower is located on the southern shore of Lake Vermilion.

History
The city was incorporated March 13, 1889, which makes it the oldest city in the Arrowhead region. It owes its establishment to the Soudan Mine, and was named after mining financier Charlemagne Tower. Tower is home to the Tower Train Museum; near the museum is McKinley Monument, the first erected in honor of former U.S. President William McKinley shortly after his assassination in 1901.  President McKinley was in office from 1897 to 1901.

Tower set the Minnesota record for coldest temperature on February 2, 1996, when the temperature dropped to -60 °F (-51 °C).  This was the lowest temperature ever recorded in the United States east of the Great Plains.  Tower and the Embarrass Valley to the south are the coldest inhabited locations in the Lower 48 states, based on average winter temperatures.

Geography

Climate
Tower has a humid continental climate (Köppen Dfb), with long, bitterly cold winters and warm summers. January averages , and lows reach  on 67 nights annually. Spring, and more especially autumn, are short but mild transition seasons. July averages , with highs reaching  on only 3.2 days annually, with only about four-fifths of all years seeing temperatures that high. Summer nights are cool despite the warm days, with the average window for freezing temperatures August 25 thru June 22. Tower is slightly colder than International Falls, but a half of a degree warmer overall than Embarrass.

Entertainment and sports

Fortune Bay Resort and Casino is located a few miles west of Tower.
It is near Lake Vermilion, a well-known lake which attracts tourists and locals alike. The casino is owned and operated by the Bois Forte Band of Chippewa.

Tower has a simple sports ground with bleacher stands, close by the Tower School. At Lake Vermillion, a run tournament named after the lake is staged every year.

Education
Tower is part of the St. Louis County school district based in Virginia, Minnesota.  In town there is the Tower-Soudan Elementary School that serves students K–6.  Students 7–12 are transported to other secondary schools nearby as Tower-Soudan does not have a secondary school at this point.

Outside of the district, Tower has a public charter school that serves students 7–12, called Vermilion Country School.  Based in the old PowerRain building, this project-based secondary school was set up by parents and townspeople who advocated for a local secondary school. Opened in 2013, VCS graduated their first 6 seniors in May 2014.

Demographics

2020 census
As of the 2020 census, there were 430 people living in an estimated 240 households in Tower.

2010 census
As of the census of 2010, there were 500 people, 265 households, and 126 families residing in the city. The racial makeup of the city was 94.6% White, 2.4% Native American, 0.6% Asian, 0.2% from other races, and 2.2% from two or more races. Hispanic or Latino of any race were 1.2% of the population.

There were 265 households, of which 20.4% had children under the age of 18 living with them, 32.5% were married couples living together, 10.2% had a female householder with no husband present, 4.9% had a male householder with no wife present, and 52.5% were non-families. 45.7% of all households were made up of individuals, and 20% had someone living alone who was 65 years of age or older. The average household size was 1.89 and the average family size was 2.61.

The median age in the city was 48.4 years. 18.8% of residents were under the age of 18; 5.6% were between the ages of 18 and 24; 21.6% were from 25 to 44; 30% were from 45 to 64; and 24% were 65 years of age or older. The gender makeup of the city was 50.8% male and 49.2% female.

2000 census
As of the census of 2000, there were 479 people in the city, organized into 233 households and 137 families. The racial makeup of the city was 97.70% White, 1.46% Native American, 0% Asian, 0% African American, 0% Pacific Islander, 0.84% from other races, and 0.00% from two or more races. 1.88% of the population were Hispanic or Latino of any race. 31.4% were of Finnish, 13.7% Norwegian, 11.1% Swedish, 8.6% German, 6.6% Slovene and 5.8% Italian ancestry according to Census 2000.

There were 233 households, out of which 20.2% had children under the age of 18 living with them, 48.9% were married couples living together, 6.0% had a female householder with no husband present, and 41.2% were non-families. 37.8% of all households were made up of individuals, and 22.3% had someone living alone who was 65 years of age or older. The average household size was 2.06 and the average family size was 2.69.

In the city, the population was spread out, with 18.6% under the age of 18, 6.5% from 18 to 24, 24.0% from 25 to 44, 26.1% from 45 to 64, and 24.8% who were 65 years of age or older. The median age was 45 years. For every 100 females, there were 93.9 males. For every 100 females age 18 and over, there were 91.2 males.

The median income for a household in the city was $26,429, and the median income for a family was $37,500. Males had a median income of $35,000 versus $21,875 for females. The per capita income for the city was $17,169. 10.7% of the population and 3.7% of families were below the poverty line. Out of the total population, 12.5% of those under the age of 18 and 10.9% of those 65 and older were living below the poverty line.

Media
Tower is served by an award-winning newspaper, the Timberjay. The Timberjay is published weekly, with a circulation of over 1000.

References

External links

Photos taken in Tower – photos taken during August 1937 – from the Library of Congress
Lake Vermilion Chamber of Commerce website

 
Cities in St. Louis County, Minnesota
Cities in Minnesota